"Our Struggle" was a pamphlet written late October 1945 by Indonesian independence leader Soetan Sjahrir. It was pivotal in redirecting the Indonesian national revolution.

In his pamphlet Sjahrir addressed all crucial spearheads of the still ongoing revolutionary struggle for Indonesia's independence. His target audiences are firstly and primarily the Indonesian masses and their leaders involved in the revolution, secondly public opinion in the colonial metropolis of the Netherlands, home of the adversary and thirdly international public opinion.

The Dutch-language editions of 1946 contain opening words by Perhimpoenan Indonesia and were used to sway Dutch public opinion during the Linggadjati negotiations. Its English translation was distributed at Westminster Hall to the British delegates to the United Nations.

Sjahrir's writings successfully countered the myth that the Indonesian republic was the brainchild of the fascist imperial Japanese forces and not a deep national desire.

Context
After the defeat of the Japanese Empire and de facto end of World War II, the capitulated and disillusioned Japanese Army and Navy in the former Dutch colony of the Dutch East Indies retreat to their barracks and await relief by Allied forces. Before the postponed arrival of Allied forces and their demobilisation the Japanese troops remain responsible to guard their former Allied POW's and European civilian prisoners.

August 1945 Indonesian leaders are pressured by revolutionary youth groups, to unilaterally declare the independent Republic of Indonesia. Within a few months the power vacuum left by retreating Japanese forces and the gradually arriving Allied forces explodes into full scale revolutionary tension. Social outgroups that next to Dutch people, include Chinese Indonesians, Dutch-Indonesian Eurasians, and Christian Indonesians such as the Depok, Ambonese and Menadonese people fall victim to violent atrocities.

A chaotic time of extreme aggression erupts that is remembered by the Dutch and Indo European victims as the Bersiap period. Sjahrir was the first leader to strongly oppose and condemn the violence committed against (fellow) citizens.

Author

After writing this pamphlet Sjahrir joined Sukarno and Hatta, the president and vice-president of the unilaterally declared republic of Indonesia as their first prime-minister. While Sukarno and Hatta were accused of having collaborated with the Axis forces and being puppets of the Japanese military, Sjahrir's reputation as anti-fascist and resistance leader enabled him to engage in the original negotiations with the returning Dutch colonial administration as well as the later Linggadjati negotiations.
 
"Perhaps the high point of his career was the publication of his pamphlet 'Our Struggle'. Whoever reads that pamphlet today can scarcely comprehend what it demanded in insight and courage. For it appeared at a moment when the Indonesian masses, brought to the boiling point by the Japanese occupation and civil war, sought release in racist and other hysterical outbursts. Sjahrir's pamphlet went directly against this, and many must have felt his call for chivalry, for the understanding of other ethnic groups, as a personal attack." Sol Tas.

Content
The pamphlet's content consists of a level headed analysis of the early situation of the revolution and clear recommendations for its successful continuation. Sjahrir warns against the negative effect the extreme violence has on the goodwill of international public opinion. Sjahrir clarifies the intense impact Japanese indoctrination has had on the Indonesian people, especially the youth (Indonesian: Pemuda). To deflect the ever growing hatred of the Japanese by the Indonesian people, the Japanese propaganda singled out ethnic target groups for persecution: westerners, Chinese Indonesians, Indo people (Eurasians), Menadonese people and Ambonese people. By the end of the Japanese occupation practices such as mandatory forced labour (Japanese: Romusha), that on average killed 80% of the Indonesian coolies, caused Indonesia’s rural and urban communities to become impoverished, dislocated, in uproar and disarray. Sjahrir explains Indonesians will never accept any form of colonisation ever again.

Publications
In 1945 the Dutch-language pamphlet was originally written by Sjahrir in Jakarta, immediately thereafter translated into the Indonesian language as 'Perdjoeangan Kita' (Our Struggle). A Dutch-language book with his preliminary thoughts named "Indonesische overpeinzingen" (Indonesian musings) was published that same year by publisher Bezige Bij, Amsterdam.

In 1946 a first edition of 9,000 pamphlets and second edition of an additional 8,000 pamphlets was printed in the Netherlands by 'Cloeck & Moedigh', published in the Dutch language by Uitgevery 'Vrij Nederland' Amsterdam under the auspices of Perhimpoenan Indonesia.

In 1949 his book was translated into the English language by Charles Wolf Jr. and named 'Out of Exile' published by John Day, New York. The later English version contains a considerable amount of additional text.

Quotes

Pages

See also
 Bersiap
 Sutan Sjahrir
 List of prime ministers of Indonesia
 Sjahrir I Cabinet
 Sjahrir II Cabinet
 Sjahrir III Cabinet

References

Notes and citations

Bibliography
Sjahrir, Soetan (1946). Onze Strijd. (Publisher: Vrij Nederland, Amsterdam, 1946)
Anderson, Benedict R. O'G. (1972). Java in a time of revolution: occupation and resistance, 1944-1946. Ithaca: Cornell University Press.

Kousbroek, Rudy Het Oostindisch kampsyndroom. (Publisher: Olympus, 2005) P.233

External links
Googlebook: Mrázek, Rudolf (1994). Sjahrir: Politics and Exile in Indonesia. Ithaca, NY: Cornell Southeast Asia Program. 
Souvenirs of Sjahrir by Sol Tas
 Sjahrir's biography
  Sjahrir's biography, History website
 Britannica on line.
 Transcript interview with Sutan Sjahrir, 1956.
  Photo gallery on Sutan Sjahrir commemoration website.

Dutch East Indies
Indo people
Pamphlets
Indonesian National Revolution
1945 non-fiction books